In mathematics a gamma number may be:
A value of the gamma function
An additively indecomposable ordinal
An ordinal Γα that is a fixed point of the Veblen hierarchy